Suzan Suzi(Kırklar Dağının Düzü)(tr) is a popular folk story in Turkey, about an impossible love between a Muslim man and a Syriac Christian girl from Diyarbakır.

Original form
The original form of the Türkü was popular in Diyarbakır.

See also
Sari Gelin
Ahcik

References

External links

Turkish folk songs